Sapieniec  is a village in the administrative district of Gmina Pozezdrze, in Węgorzewo County, Warmian-Masurian Voivodeship, northern Poland.

References

Sapieniec